This is a list of Campeonato Brasileiro Série A top scorers.

All-time top scorers
Below is a list of the 20 best-placed all-time top scorers according to O Globo (2014), and Lance! (2021) and GloboEsporte (2023).

Players in bold stills active.

Scoring by season
This is the list of Campeonato Brasileiro Série A top scorers season by season.

Taça Brasil

Roberto Gomes Pedrosa

Série A

Top Scorer by player

Top scorers by club

See also
 Brazilian Football Confederation (CBF)

References

 
Brazil
Brazil
Association football player non-biographical articles